Honestly may refer to:

Albums
Honestly (Lalah Hathaway album) or the title song, 2017
Honestly, by Boney James, 2017
Honestly, by Joey Yung, 2001

Songs
"Honestly" (Cartel song), 2006
"Honestly" (Daniel Schuhmacher song), 2009
"Honestly" (Harem Scarem song), 1992
"Honestly" (Hot Chelle Rae song), 2012
"Honestly" (Stryper song), 1987
"Honestly" (Zwan song), 2002
"Honestly"/"Honestly (Encore)", by Gabbie Hanna, 2018
"Honestly?", by American Football from American Football, 1999
"Honestly", by Charlotte Church from Back to Scratch, 2010
"Honestly", by Kelly Clarkson from Stronger, 2011

See also 
 Honesty (disambiguation)